Bernice Mathews (born November 12, 1933) was a Democratic member of the Nevada Senate, represented Washoe County District 1 (map) from 1995 to 2010.

Education
Bernice Mathews received her education from the following institutions:
MEd, Administration of Higher Education, University of Nevada, Reno
BSN, University of Nevada, Reno

Political experience
Bernice Mathews has had the following political experience:
Assistant Minority Leader, Senator, Nevada State Senate, 1994-2010
Former City Councilwoman, Reno City Council

Caucuses and non-legislative committees
Bernice Mathews has been a member of the following committees:
Member, Governor's Commission on Nursing and Nursing Education, present
Past Chairman, Reno Civil Service Commission

Professional experience
Bernice Mathews has had the following professional experience:
Director, Health Science-Nursing (Emeritus), present
Small Business Owner, present

References

External links
Nevada State Legislature - Senator Bernice Mathews official government website
Project Vote Smart - Senator Bernice Mathews (NV) profile
Follow the Money - Bernice Martin Mathews
2006 2004 20021998 1994 campaign contributions

Nevada city council members
Democratic Party members of the Nevada Assembly
Democratic Party Nevada state senators
1933 births
Living people
Politicians from Jackson, Mississippi
University of Nevada, Reno alumni
Women state legislators in Nevada
Women city councillors in Nevada
American nurses
American women nurses
21st-century American women